Irinjalakuda railway station (Station code: IJK) is a railway station situated  in Kallettumkara village, Kerala, India. Irinjalakuda town is 8 km away from the station. It is a busy and prominent station in terms of the number of passengers between Thrissur and Alwaye stations. Irinjalakuda railway station is operated by the Chennai-headquartered Southern Railways of the Indian Railways. Irinjalakuda railway station is operated by the Chennai-headquartered Southern Railway of the Indian Railways. A total of 22 pairs of trains, including superfast, express and passenger trains, stop here.

See also

Thrissur Railway Passengers’ Association

References

Thiruvananthapuram railway division
Railway stations in Thrissur district
railway station
Railway stations opened in 1902
Thrissur railway station
Railway stations in Kerala